Journal of Clinical Rheumatology is a peer reviewed and indexed medical journal in the field of clinical rheumatology, published by PANLAR, Panamerican League of Associations for Rheumatology.

External links
 

Rheumatology journals
English-language journals
8 times per year journals